

Political Affiliation
DTA – Democratic Turnhalle Alliance

See also
Namibia
Bantustans in South West Africa
Apartheid
Presidents of Namibia
Prime Ministers of Namibia

References

Apartheid in South West Africa
Bantustans in South West Africa